American country music artist Eric Church has released seven studio albums, two live albums, three extended plays, and 29 singles (including six as a featured artist). He made his debut on the Billboard Hot Country Songs with his 2006 single "How 'Bout You". Church charted eight more singles between then and 2011 when he achieved his first number-one single with "Drink in My Hand". This would be the first of six solo number-one singles for him in his career, the other five being "Springsteen" in 2012, "Give Me Back My Hometown" and "Talladega" in 2014, "Record Year" in 2016, and "Some of It" in 2019. Church was also a featured artist on four other songs that have reached the top of the country music charts. These are Jason Aldean's "The Only Way I Know" (also featuring Luke Bryan) in 2012, Keith Urban's "Raise 'Em Up" in 2015, the multi-artist collaboration "Forever Country" in 2016 (credited to the Artists of Then, Now, and Forever), and Luke Combs' "Does to Me" in 2020.

Church has released six studio albums for Capitol Records Nashville/EMI Nashville: Sinners Like Me, Carolina, Chief, The Outsiders, Mr. Misunderstood, and Desperate Man. Of these, Chief is his most commercially successful, having been certified triple-platinum by the Recording Industry Association of America (RIAA). Both this album and The Outsiders are his most successful on the charts, having topped both Top Country Albums and the Billboard 200 upon their release.

In April 2021, Church released his seventh studio album, the triple set Heart & Soul.

Studio albums

2000s

2010s

2020s

Live albums

Compilation albums

Extended plays

Singles

2000s

2010s

2020s

As a featured artist

Other charted songs

Music videos

Notes

References

Country music discographies
Discographies of American artists